University of Western States is a private health science-focused university in Portland, Oregon. Founded in 1904, UWS is the second oldest chiropractic university in the world. The university has just under 1,000 students enrolled in both online and on campus.

History
University of Western States can trace its history back to 1904 originally named the Marsh School and Cure by John and Eva Marsh. In 1967 the name became Western States Chiropractic College. In 1973, Western States relocated to its current  campus in Northeast Portland. The institution name changed again to University of Western States in 2010. University of Western States was the first chiropractic college to receive a federally funded research grant through the United States Health Resources and Services Administration. Western States added a new $4 million lecture hall in 2001, and a $3.6 million anatomy laboratory in 2011. The anatomy lab took first place for its category in the TopProjects contest held by the Daily Journal of Commerce.

As part of the COVID-19 pandemic, the school received between $2 million and $5 million in federally backed small business loan from US Bank as part of the Paycheck Protection Program. The university stated it would allow them to retain an undefined number of jobs.

Academics
UWS offers a four-year Doctor of Chiropractic (DC) degree program that is the second-oldest in the world. The program is a 12 academic-quarter, first-professional doctoral degree offered on campus in Portland, Oregon. 
Other master's and graduate certificate programs include: Sports Medicine, Human Nutrition and Functional Medicine (HNFM), Exercise and Sport Science (ESS), Sport and Performance Psychology (SPP), Clinical Mental Health Counseling (CMHC) and a Master of Science in Diagnostic Imaging and Residency to train chiropractic physicians as specialists in radiology, and prepare students for credentialing examinations administered by the American Chiropractic Board of Radiology. A doctor of education (EdD) in Sport and Performance Psychology is also offered.

UWS offers a Bachelor of Science in Human Biology completion program to chiropractic students.

In 2015, UWS launched the Northwest Center for Lifestyle and Functional Medicine (NWCLFM) to help educate students on achieving and maintaining a healthy lifestyle focusing primarily on diet, exercise, and positive cognitive behavior.

Accreditation
University of Western States is accredited by the Northwest Commission on Colleges and Universities, indicating that UWS meets criteria for the assessment of institutional quality, evaluated through a peer review process. The master's degree programs in Human Nutrition and Functional Medicine, Exercise and Sport Science and Sport and Performance Psychology are regionally accredited through the Northwest Commission. The Doctor of Chiropractic degree program at University of Western States is awarded programmatic accreditation by the Council on Chiropractic Education (CCE). The UWS Massage Therapy program is accredited by the Commission on Massage Therapy Accreditation (COMTA). The Oregon Office of Degree Authorization approves University of Western States to award degrees.

UWS was the first chiropractic college to receive a federally-funded research grant through the United States Health Resources and Services Administration.

References

External links

 Official website

Chiropractic schools in the United States
Universities and colleges in Portland, Oregon
Educational institutions established in 1904
Universities and colleges accredited by the Northwest Commission on Colleges and Universities
1904 establishments in Oregon
Private universities and colleges in Oregon